Bison Transport is one of Canada's largest trucking companies.

Based in Winnipeg, Manitoba, Canada, Bison Transport was incorporated in 1969 by owner Duncan M. Jessiman. Bison has since grown from 18 tractors and 32 employees to over 2100 trucks and 6000 trailers with over 3700 employees and contractors.

Bison Transport operates 6 key terminal hubs in Canada, located in Winnipeg, Mississauga, Edmonton, Calgary, Regina, and Langley. Cross-border truckload transportation is provided from British Columbia through the Maritimes and to 48 U.S. states.

Bison's divisions include Dry Van, Long Combination Vehicle (LCV), Refrigerated, Intermodal, Asset-Based Logistics, Less Than Truckload, and Warehousing and Distribution. The company was mentioned as the 'Best Fleet to Drive For' by the Truckload Carriers Association and CarriersEdge in 2018.

On 5 January 2021, it was confirmed by news sources that James Richardson & Sons had purchased the company.

History 
Bison Transport was established by on 28 May 1969 by Duncan M. Jessiman, when he deployed 18 trucks manned by 32 employees in Winnipeg. The following year, Bison made its first acquisition, the local carrier RC Owen Transport. It acquired the local carrier Echo Transport in 1979 before expanding its business into the United States in 1981.

In 1991, Bison moved into the retail sector, initiating a lasting relationship with Walmart. The company moved into warehousing in Winnipeg in 1996 to better serve its customers. It deployed satellite tracking for its services in 1999 and launched a logistics division in 2001. In 2004, Bison added a refrigerated division that has since grown to 650 reefers. It also launched a long combination vehicle fleet, which consists of 220 dedicated tractors as of 2019. Bison moved into the intermodal business in 2006, with its own 53-foot containers. The company then expanded westwards, opening facilities in Regina, Edmonton and Calgary. Bison moved into the flat-deck segment in 2014 after buying Searcy Transport in Winnipeg. The company celebrated its 50th anniversary in 2019.

On 5 January 2021, it was confirmed by news sources that James Richardson & Sons had purchased the company.

References

External links
Bison Transport 

Companies based in Winnipeg
James Richardson & Sons
Transport in Manitoba
Transport in Canada